Euclides Calzado Carbonell (born 5 April 1944) is a Cuban racewalker. He competed in the men's 20 kilometres walk at the 1968 Summer Olympics.

References

1944 births
Living people
Athletes (track and field) at the 1967 Pan American Games
Athletes (track and field) at the 1968 Summer Olympics
Cuban male racewalkers
Olympic athletes of Cuba
Place of birth missing (living people)
Central American and Caribbean Games medalists in athletics
Central American and Caribbean Games silver medalists for Cuba
Competitors at the 1966 Central American and Caribbean Games
Pan American Games competitors for Cuba
20th-century Cuban people
21st-century Cuban people